Descendants: School of Secrets (also abbreviated simply as School of  Secrets) is a live action fantasy short-form television series based on the Disney Channel Original Movie Descendants. It premiered on July 2, 2015 on the Disney Channel and its digital platforms, including WATCH Disney Channel.

The series was introduced leading up to Descendants to build anticipation and show a sneak peek into Auradon Prep.

The show is set between Ben making his proclamation and the Villain Kids arriving in Auradon.

Plot
An unidentified girl (Lonnie) sets up a hidden camera to capture Auradon Prep's secrets. Her goal: to expose the "real" Auradon and release hidden camera footage to the public. But when Prince Ben announces that villain kids are on their way to Auradon, the hidden camera begins to reveal all sorts of attitudes, secrets and anxieties before the villain kids' arrival.

Cast
 Dianne Doan as Lonnie – the daughter of Fa Mulan and Li Shang. She is possibly the unidentified girl filming Auradon Prep's students.
 Mitchell Hope as King Ben – the son of Belle and the Beast. He is the current king of Auradon.
 Sarah Jeffery as Princess Audrey – the daughter of Aurora and Prince Phillip.
 Brenna D'Amico as Jane - the daughter of The Fairy Godmother.
 Aric Floyd as Best Bro
 Mark Daugherty as School Reporter 
 Blake Rosier as Sleepy
 Ben Stillwell as Happy
 Maxwell Chase as Jock
 Teresa Decher as Long Haired Princess
 Chloe Madison as Lost Girl
 Miles Tagtmeyer as Reasonable Student

Episodes

References

External links

2015 American television series debuts
2015 American television series endings
American children's fantasy television series
Disney Channel original programming
Television series by Disney
Descendants (franchise)
Fantasy television series